Royal Castle may refer to:
 Royal Castle (chain restaurant), founded in Miami
 Royal Castle (restaurant), restaurant chain in Trinidad and Tobago
Royal Castle, Poznań, Poland
 Royal Castle, Warsaw, Poland
Royal Castle of Laeken, Belgium, official residence of royal family
 Royal Castle Hotel, hotel in Dartmouth, Devon, England

See also

Royal Palace (disambiguation)
Castle (disambiguation)
Royal (disambiguation)